In enzymology, a scopoletin glucosyltransferase is an enzyme that catalyzes the chemical reaction

UDP-glucose + scopoletin  UDP + scopolin

Thus, the two substrates of this enzyme are UDP-glucose and scopoletin, whereas its two products are UDP and scopolin.

This enzyme belongs to the family of glycosyltransferases, specifically the hexosyltransferases.  The systematic name of this enzyme class is UDP-glucose:scopoletin O-beta-D-glucosyltransferase. Other names in common use include uridine diphosphoglucose-scopoletin glucosyltransferase, UDP-glucose:scopoletin glucosyltransferase, and SGTase.  This enzyme participates in phenylpropanoid biosynthesis.

References 

 
 

EC 2.4.1
Enzymes of unknown structure
Coumarins metabolism